Avigdor Yitzhaki (born 13 September 1949) is an Israeli politician. He is a former member of the Knesset for Kadima, having been the party's parliamentary group chairman and head of the coalition. He is the chairman of Friends of Schneider.

On 2 May 2007, Yitzhaki requested that Prime Minister Ehud Olmert resign as soon as possible following the Winograd Commission's first report. On 7 February 2008 he resigned from the Knesset due to "serious doubts over Ehud Olmert's ability to lead the government in the wake of the Winograd Report".

References

External links

Members of the 17th Knesset (2006–2009)
1949 births
Living people
Kadima politicians